Fort Myers Regional Library is a public library located in downtown Fort Myers, Florida. It is part of the Lee County Library System.

Location 
Fort Myers Regional Library is located at 2450 First St., Fort Myers, FL 33901. The library is in the River District of downtown Fort Myers.

Services 
Fort Myers Regional Library provides access to a large collection of fiction and non-fiction materials. The location offers public computers, Wi-Fi access, meeting and study rooms, printing, and scanning. The library is a Florida State Publications Depository Library, housing and providing public access to publications from Florida state agencies.

Genealogy 
The Fort Myers Regional Library branch houses the county library system's genealogy collection, the largest in Southwest Florida, in their dedicated Genealogy Room. Patrons can access print, microform, and digital resources for their research needs. The library is designated as a Family History Library Affiliate, providing access to the Family History Library's digital microfilm records. Library cardholders have free access to Ancestry.com within the library. This branch has trained staff to assist with genealogical research.

Programs 
The library hosts a variety of programs for all ages, including storytime, book discussions, arts and crafts classes, genealogy classes, English Cafe, and technology classes. The library hosts the annual Southwest Florida Reading Festival to promote the use of public library resources and the importance of reading.

References 

Public libraries in Florida
Fort Myers, Florida